Newton Dale Halt railway station is a request stop on the North Yorkshire Moors Railway and serves as a stopping off point for walkers around Newton Dale and Cropton Forest in the North York Moors National Park, North Yorkshire, England. When the station was opened, the station signs were written as Newtondale Halt.

The halt was built by the North Yorkshire Moors Railway using materials from Warrenby Halt, near Redcar. The halt was a new construction that was a joint enterprise between the NYMR, the Forestry Commission and the North Yorks Moors National Park Authority. The station was opened in 1981 near to the former Newtondale signal box that had last been used in 1930 and was demolished by the NYMR in 1995 due to it being unsafe.

There is no road access to Newton Dale Halt and it is a request stop.

A small NER style wooden waiting shelter has been erected at the halt, it is based on the design of the one which used to stand at Sledmere and Fimber on the closed Malton & Driffield Railway but reduced in size and eliminating the windows.

There are four different waymarked walks from Newton Dale Halt, provided by the National Park in conjunction with the Forestry Commission.  The walks vary in length and difficulty to suit most walkers.  The longer walks take the walker to Levisham station. For the more enthusiastic (and better equipped) walker there are public footpaths leading elsewhere, including Goathland station but definitive maps are advisable.

References

External links
 Train times and information from the North Yorkshire Moors Railway

Heritage railway stations in North Yorkshire
Railway stations in Great Britain without road access
North Yorkshire Moors Railway
Railway stations built for UK heritage railways
Railway stations in Great Britain opened in 1981
Railway request stops in Great Britain